Cleberson Luis Marques, or simply Cleberson (born July 4, 1984) is a Brazilian striker. He currently plays for Comercial Futebol Clube (SP).

Cleberson previously played for Tokushima Vortis in the J2 League.

Club statistics

References

External links

1984 births
Living people
Brazilian footballers
Brazilian expatriate footballers
J2 League players
FC Porto players
Tokushima Vortis players
União São João Esporte Clube players
Clube Atlético Bragantino players
São José Esporte Clube players
Expatriate footballers in Portugal
Expatriate footballers in Japan
Association football forwards